The 1987 Asian Wrestling Championships were held in Mumbai, India. The event took place from 13 to 17 October 1987.

Medal table

Team ranking

Medal summary

Men's freestyle

Men's Greco-Roman

References

External links 
UWW Database

Asia
W
Asian Wrestling Championships
International wrestling competitions hosted by India